Rojava–Kurdistan Region relations refers to the relationship between the Autonomous Administration of North and East Syria (commonly called Rojava), and the Government of Iraq's Kurdistan Region. While they share much culturally, they also have many political differences. There has been military cooperation with Kurdistan Region and the United States in the conflict against Islamic State of Iraq and the Levant (ISIL), although neither gives official support for Rojava or its People's Protection Units (YPG). The Kurdistan Regional Government enforced a unilateral economic blockade against Rojava which has damaged and limited the region's economy. The "Sultanistic system" of Iraqi Kurdistan stands in stark contrast to the democratic confederalist system of the Rojava.

The dominant political party in Rojava, the Democratic Union Party (PYD), is a member of the Kurdistan Communities Union (KCK) organisation. Although KCK member organisations in the neighbouring states with autochthonous Kurdish minorities are either outlawed (as in Iran and Turkey) or politically marginal with respect to other Kurdish parties (as in Iraq), the PYD-governed NES region has acquired the role of a model for the KCK political agenda and blueprint in general.

There is much sympathy for Rojava, in particular among Kurds in Turkey. During the Siege of Kobanî, a large number of ethnic Kurdish citizens of Turkey crossed the border and volunteered in the defence of the town. Upon their return to Turkey, some of these took up arms in the renewed Kurdish–Turkish conflict, where skills acquired by them during combat in Kobanî brought a new quality of urban warfare to the conflict in Turkey.

Like the KCK umbrella in general, and even more so, the PYD is critical of any form of nationalism, including Kurdish nationalism, putting them at odds with the Kurdish nationalist visions of the KDP-sponsored Kurdish National Council in Rojava.

See also
Foreign relations of Rojava
Foreign relations of Kurdistan Region
Rojava conflict
Syrian civil war
Iraq–Syria relations

References

Rojava
Iraq–Syria relations
Kurdish nationalism
Politics of Syria
Syrian civil war
Politics of the Autonomous Administration of North and East Syria